Imhotep (fl. 27th century BC) was an ancient Egyptian architect,  physician, and court official.

Imhotep can also refer to:

People 
 Imhotep (vizier) (18th dynasty), an ancient Egyptian Vizier under Thutmose I

Arts and entertainment
 Imhotep (musician)
 Imhotep (The Mummy), a fictional character
 Imhotep, computer game for the Commodore 64, released by Ultimate play the Game
 "Im-Ho-Tep (Pharaoh's Curse)", a song by Iced Earth
 A character in Agatha Christie's novel Death Comes as the End

Space
 Imhotep (crater), a crater on Mercury
 1813 Imhotep, a main-belt asteroid
 A flat region on the comet 67P/Churyumov–Gerasimenko

Other uses
 Imhotep Institute Charter High School in Philadelphia, Pennsylvania